Maria Grazia Schiavo is an Italian classical soprano who is particularly known for her performances of music from the baroque period. She has performed with major opera houses in Austria, France, Germany, Italy, and Spain, and has appeared in concerts throughout Europe.

Life and career
Born in Naples, Schiavo was trained in her native city at the Conservatorio San Pietro a Majella. After graduating, she won several music competitions; including the Accademia Nazionale di Santa Cecilia competition and the International Singing Competition of Clermont-Ferrand. She quickly established herself as an artist in the baroque repertoire and has appeared in concerts of baroque music with the Accademia Bizantina, Al Ayre Español, Auser Musici, Concerto Italiano, Europa Galante, La Risonanza, Les Talents Lyriques, and the Sonatori de la Gioiosa Marca. Notable conductors under whom she has performed include: Rinaldo Alessandrini, Eduardo Lopez Banzo, Fabio Biondi, William Christie, Ottavio Dantone, Antonio Florio, Riccardo Muti, Christophe Rousset, and Jordi Savall.

Schiavo made her professional opera debut in the title role of Roberto De Simone's La Gatta Cenerentola. In 2007 she portrayed the role of Poppea in Domenico Scarlatti's Ottavia restituita al trono with the Opera de San Sebastián and Idaspe in Antonio Vivaldi's Bajazet at La Fenice. In March 2008 she repeated the role of Idaspe at the Salle Pleyel in Paris and at the Teatro Real in Madrid. She was also heard at the Teatro Real that year as Euridice/Proserpina/La Música in Claudio Monteverdi's L'Orfeo. In February 2008 she performed the role of Faustina in the first modern performance of Leonardo Leo's Alidoro with the Cappella della Pietà de' Turchini in Reggio Emilia. In July 2008 she sang the roles of Sabina in Giovanni Battista Pergolesi's Adriano in Siria and Scarlatti's Poppea at the Festival de Beaune.

In the 2008-2009 season, Schiavo performed the roles of Almirena in George Frideric Handel's Rinaldo (Festival de Beaune), Dalinda in Handel's Ariodante (Vienna State Opera), Dircea in Niccolò Jommelli's Demofoonte (Ravenna Festival and Salzburg Festival), and Seleuce in Handel's Tolomeo (Teatro Arriaga, Bilbao). In the 2009-2010 season, she sang the roles of Almirena (Théâtre des Champs-Élysées), Amital in Wolfgang Amadeus Mozart's Betulia liberata (Salzburg Festival), Berenice in Vivaldi's Farnace (Vienna State Opera), Euridice in Johann Joseph Fux's Orfeo ed Euridice (Le Concert des Nations, Graz), Rosmira in Leonardo Vinci's Partenope ( and Teatro de la Maestranza), and Venere in Antonio Cesti's Le disgrazie d'Amore. In 2011 she is scheduled to perform the roles of Anaï in Gioachino Rossini's Moïse et Pharaon at the Teatro dell'Opera di Roma, Berenice at the Théâtre des Champs-Élysées in Paris and the title heroine in Gaetano Donizetti's Lucia di Lammermoor at the Teatro Regio di Torino.

References

External links
Maria Grazia Schiavo at www.allegorica.it
Maria Grazia Schiavo Operabase

Living people
Italian operatic sopranos
Musicians from Naples
21st-century Italian  women opera singers
Year of birth missing (living people)